Arthur Chollon (born 15 December 1988) is a French rugby union player. His position is Flanker and he currently plays for Stade Français in the Top 14. He began his career with home-town club Bordeaux Bègles before moving to Stade Français in 2011.

References

1988 births
Living people
French rugby union players
Sportspeople from Bordeaux
Stade Français players
Rugby union flankers
Union Bordeaux Bègles players
US Dax players
SC Albi players